is an entertainment company specializing in the manufacture of pachinko machines. The company is headquartered in Momoyama, Kasugai, Aichi Prefecture, Japan.

Major models
Big Porter
Caravan
Caster
CR Bikkuriman 2000 (2006)
CR High School! Kimengumi (2003)
CR Kinnikuman (2003)
CR Segawa Eiko de Gozaimasu (2004)
CR Umi e Ikō Rakuen Tengoku (2001)
CR Woody Woodpecker (2004)
CRE Adventure (2002)
Fine Play (1994)
Prism
Super Fine Play (2002)

References

External links
 Maruhon official site

Companies based in Aichi Prefecture
Amusement companies of Japan
Gambling companies of Japan
Electronics companies of Japan
Software companies of Japan